Charleroi is a parliamentary constituency in Belgium used to elect members of the Walloon Parliament since 1995. It corresponds to the Arrondissement of Charleroi.

Representatives

References

Constituencies of the Parliament of Wallonia